The Pine Mountain Regional Library System is a group of seven public libraries that serve Meriwether, Upson, Talbot, and Taylor counties in Georgia, United States. The library regional headquarters is located in Manchester, Georgia.

Pine Mountain Library is a member of PINES, a program of the Georgia Public Library Service that covers 53 library systems in 143 counties of Georgia. Any resident in a PINES supported library system has access to the system's collection of 10.6 million books. The library is also serviced by GALILEO, a program of the University System of Georgia which stands for "GeorgiA LIbrary LEarning Online". This program offers residents in supported libraries access to over 100 databases indexing thousands of periodicals and scholarly journals. It also boasts over 10,000 journal titles in full text.

History
The first library in the region was started in 1938 in Manchester, Georgia, and was sponsored by both the Woman's Club of Manchester as well as the city. Initially this library was located at the police station and housed 100 volumes that were borrowed from the state of Georgia.

In Meriwether County, the first library was chartered in 1950. The following year neighboring counties Talbot and Upson agreed to add their collections to the growing collection of Meriwether, and thus formed a regional library system. With the addition of Taylor County in 1958 the name of the library was changed to its present form.

In 1972 a need for new buildings arose and three new libraries were constructed in Butler, Talbotton, and Greenville. By the next year another library branch opened in Thomaston. This branch moved in 1980 and was rededicated as the Hightower Memorial Library.

In 1994 the Butler and Greenville libraries each received their own new buildings. The headquarters library, which was previously moved to the basement of the county community building, received a renovation and enlargement of its own in 1995. The newest library finished construction in 2002 in Yatesville.

Branches

Library systems in neighboring counties
Coweta Public Library System to the north
Flint River Regional Library System to the northeast
Middle Georgia Regional Library System to the west
Lake Blackshear Regional Library System to the south
Chattahoochee Valley Libraries to the southwest
Troup-Harris Regional Library to the west

References

External links
PINES catalog

County library systems in Georgia (U.S. state)
Public libraries in Georgia (U.S. state)